Yashodhara Lal is an Indian author best known for her book How I Became A Farmer's Wife published in 2018 by HarperCollins. Her book When Love Finds You was published in 2016 by Harlequin India.

Lal's other books include There's Something About You (2015), Sorting Out Sid (2014), and Just Married, Please Excuse (2012). Yashodhara has also authored two children's book, entitled Peanut has a Plan (2016)., and "Peanut vs. the Piano", the sequel. The books are based on her daughter and twin sons. Lal refers to them as 'Peanut, Pickle, and Papad'. Her newest book, "Those Days In Delhi", was published in June 2019.

References

External links 
 Amazon author page

21st-century Indian novelists
Living people
English-language writers from India
Indian women novelists
Year of birth missing (living people)
21st-century Indian women writers